Jasenica (Gradačac)  (Cyrillic: Јасеница) is a village in the municipalities of Modriča (Republika Srpska) and Gradačac, Bosnia and Herzegovina.

Demographics 
According to the 2013 census, its population was 269, with 46 of them living in the Modriča part and 223 in the Gradačac part.

References

Populated places in Gradačac
Populated places in Modriča